"Calling All Angels" is a song by the Canadian singer/songwriter Jane Siberry. It was featured on the soundtrack for Wim Wenders 1991 film, Until the End of the World, and in the final scene and on the soundtrack for the film Pay It Forward, as well as in episode 1, season 4 of the television series The Fosters and in Season 1 of The Chair on Netflix. It also plays over the end credits of the 2021 film The Many Saints of Newark.

Formats and track listing 
All songs written by Jane Siberry.
US 1991 single (PRO-CD-5398)
"Calling All Angels" (edit) – 4:12
"Calling All Angels" – 5:11

Canadian 2001 single (SHE009)
"Calling All Angels" – 5:42
"Are You Burning, Little Candle? (A Love Song to Children)" – 5:44

Charts

Personnel
Adapted from the Calling All Angels liner notes.
 Teddy Borowiecki – piano
 k.d. lang – vocals
 Ben Mink – viola
 Ken Myhr – guitar
 Jane Siberry – vocals, guitar, piano, keyboards, production

Release history

References

External links 
 Calling All Angels at Discogs (list of releases)

1991 songs
1991 singles
Jane Siberry songs
Songs written by Jane Siberry
Song recordings produced by Jane Siberry
Reprise Records singles